Pikeside is an unincorporated community in Berkeley County, West Virginia, United States. Pikeside is situated along U.S. Route 11, approximately 3.4 miles south of Martinsburg.

The community was named for a turnpike near the original town site.

References

Unincorporated communities in Berkeley County, West Virginia
Unincorporated communities in West Virginia